The Armstrong Siddeley Hyena was a British aero engine developed by Armstrong Siddeley.  Designed in the 1930s, it was an unusual experimental radial engine with inline cylinder banks. It was flown using an Armstrong Whitworth A.W.16 fighter aircraft as a test bed. Unresolved problems with cooling of the rear cylinders prevented the engine from going into production. Few details of this engine survive as company records were lost.

Armstrong Siddeley in-line radial engines
The Hyena arrangement of cylinder banks arranged as a radial engine was continued with further designs, but with little commercial success, with only the Deerhound and Hyena being built.

Hyena 15 cylinders (5 banks of 3 cyl.)
Terrier 14 cylinders (7 banks of 2 cyl.)
Deerhound 21 cylinders (7 banks of 3 cyl.)
Wolfhound 28 cylinders (7 banks of 4 cyl.)
Boarhound 24 cylinders (6 banks of 4 cyl.)
Mastiff 36 cylinders (9 banks of 4 cyl.)

Specifications (Hyena)

See also

References

Notes

Bibliography

 Lumsden, Alec. British Piston Engines and their Aircraft. Marlborough, Wiltshire: Airlife Publishing, 2003. .

Hyena
Inline radial engines
1930s aircraft piston engines
Aircraft air-cooled inline piston engines